Jacques Sterckval (born 9 August 1884, date of death unknown) was a Belgian footballer. He played in two matches for the Belgium national football team in 1909.

References

External links
 

1884 births
Year of death missing
Belgian footballers
Belgium international footballers
Place of birth missing
Association football defenders